Miłosz Horodyski (born 1974 in Kraków) is an artist, painter, a Polish film director and television director, film producer, an academic teacher  and journalist. He lives and works in Kraków as journalist in a Polish Television TVP Kraków. He is also an academic teacher at Jan Matejko Academy of Fine Arts in Kraków.

Documentaries  

 2007 
 2007 
 2007 
 2008 
 2008 
 2008 
 2009  ("The Smokes over the Ark of the Lord")
 2009  ("The Special supervision gosip")

References

External links 
Miłosz Horodyski at the Filmpolski Database

1974 births
Living people
Polish film directors
Film people from Kraków
Journalists from Kraków